Roland Piquepaille (18 October 1946 – 6 January 2009) was a technology writer for ZDNet and a former software engineer at Silicon Graphics and Cray Research. 

He died in Paris, France, on 6 January 2009, of complications related to an enterococcal bacteria infection.

References 

1940s births
2009 deaths
Cray employees
French non-fiction writers
French male non-fiction writers
20th-century French male writers